Willem Boerdam  (2 November 1883 – 9 December 1966) was a Dutch footballer. He was part of the Netherlands national football team, playing 2 matches.

Career
An agile and stocky technician, he was nicknamed Willem de Springer (Willem the Jumper) because of his athletic footballing style. He played the majority of his career for Sparta.

He played his first match on 25 April 1909. He was part of the Dutch team at the 1908 Summer Olympics, but because he did not play he didn't get a bronze medal.

See also
 List of Dutch international footballers

References

External links

1883 births
1966 deaths
People from Vlaardingen 
Footballers from Rotterdam 
Association football midfielders
Dutch footballers
Netherlands international footballers
Sparta Rotterdam players